Rimaleh (also Romanized as Rīmaleh and Rīmleh; also known as Rapamleh) is a village in Robat Rural District, in the Central District of Khorramabad County, Lorestan Province, Iran. At the 2006 census, its population was 467, in 104 families.

References 

Towns and villages in Khorramabad County